Sahr Jonathan Morsay (born 5 October 1997) is a professional footballer who plays as a winger for Greek Super League club Panetolikos. Born in Sweden, he represents the Sierra Leone national team.

Club career
On 29 January 2020, he signed a 2.5-year contract with Italian Serie B club Chievo. He was loaned at Dinamo București in February 2021.

On 6 August 2021, he joined Panetolikos on a two-year contract.

International career
Born in Sweden, Morsay was born to a Sierra Leonean father and Swedish mother. He is a youth international for Sweden. He debuted for the Sierra Leone national team in a friendly 3–0 loss to Togo on 24 March 2022.

References

External links 
 
  (archive)

1997 births
Living people
People from Sundsvall
Sierra Leonean footballers
Sierra Leone international footballers
Swedish footballers
Sweden youth international footballers
Sierra Leonean people of Swedish descent
Swedish people of Sierra Leonean descent
Association football midfielders
Allsvenskan players
Superettan players
Serie B players
Liga I players
Super League Greece players
GIF Sundsvall players
IK Brage players
A.C. ChievoVerona players
FC Dinamo București players
Panetolikos F.C. players
Sierra Leonean expatriate footballers
Swedish expatriate footballers
Expatriate footballers in Sweden
Sierra Leonean expatriate sportspeople in Sweden
Expatriate footballers in Italy
Sierra Leonean expatriates in Italy
Swedish expatriate sportspeople in Italy
Sierra Leonean expatriate sportspeople in Italy
Expatriate footballers in Romania
Sierra Leonean expatriates in Romania
Swedish expatriate sportspeople in Romania
Sierra Leonean expatriate sportspeople in Romania
Expatriate footballers in Greece
Sierra Leonean expatriates in Greece
Swedish expatriate sportspeople in Greece
Sierra Leonean expatriate sportspeople in Greece
Sportspeople from Västernorrland County